Zgornji Slemen is a dispersed settlement in the hills northwest of Maribor in northeastern Slovenia. The settlement is divided between the City Municipality of Maribor and the Municipality of Selnica ob Dravi.

References

External links
Zgornji Slemen on Geopedia

Populated places in the City Municipality of Maribor